Wolf Trap is a 1957 Czech drama film by Jiří Weiss, based on the 1938 Jarmila Glazarová's novel of the same name.

Plot
Orphaned 18-year-old girl Jana comes to live with a childless couple – Robert and Klára, his much older wife. Robert falls in love with Jana.

Production
The film was shot in Sobotka and Stromovka park in Prague. Interior scenes were shot in Hostivař Studios. The first choice for the role of Jana was an actress Jana Rybářová, who committed suicide before the start of the shooting.

Cast
 Miroslav Doležal as Mayor Robert Rýdl
 Jiřina Šejbalová as Klára Rýdlová
 Jana Brejchová as Jana, their foster daughter
 Jaroslav Průcha as Family physician
 Libuše Freslová as Schillingerová
 Lola Skrbková as Maid Petronila
 Alena Kreuzmannová as Gertruda
 Josef Kozák as Frýdecký
 František Holar as Grocer

Awards and nominations
Venice Film Festival
Won: FIPRESCI Award
Won: New Cinema Award
Won: Special Jury Award for Jiřina Šejbalová
Nominated: Golden Lion

References

External links
 

1957 films
Czech drama films
Czechoslovak drama films
Films based on Czech novels
1950s Czech-language films
1950s Czech films